Ananthu is a Tamil singer known for his songs in the Tamil film Kabali (2016) and "Sendumalli" song from Jai Bhim (2021).

Career 
Ananthu worked under M. S. Vishwanathan. He worked on a few songs in the 1990s, but none of his songs were chartbusters. He garnered acclaim for his song "Puli Urumudhu" in Vettaikaaran (2009) and "Ulagam Oruvanukka"  and "Maya Nadhi" in Kabali (2016). The success of his songs in Tamil the makers to allow him to sing "Ulagam Oruvanukka" in the Telugu version and "Maya Nadhi" in the Telugu and Hindi versions of the film.

Discography

Tamil songs

Telugu songs

Hindi songs

Malayalam songs

References

External links 

Indian male playback singers
Tamil playback singers
Telugu playback singers
Malayalam playback singers
Bollywood playback singers
Living people
Year of birth missing (living people)